Elmo is a town in Emery County, Utah, United States. The population was 418 at the 2010 census, up from 368 in 2000.

Geography

Demographics

As of the census of 2000, there were 368 people, 112 households, and 93 families residing in the town. The population density was 597.9 people per square mile (229.2/km2). There were 120 housing units at an average density of 195.0 per square mile (74.7/km2). The racial makeup of the town was 96.74% White, 0.27% African American, 0.54% Native American, 0.54% Pacific Islander, and 1.90% from two or more races. Hispanic or Latino of any race were 4.35% of the population.

There were 112 households, of which 42.9% had children under 18 living with them, 75.0% were married couples living together, 5.4% had a female householder with no husband present, and 16.1% were non-families. 16.1% of all households were made up of individuals, and 10.7% had someone living alone who was 65 years of age or older. The average household size was 3.11, and the average family size was 3.43.

In the town, the population was spread out, with 30.4% under 18, 11.1% from 18 to 24, 20.4% from 25 to 44, 20.9% from 45 to 64, and 17.1% who were 65 years of age or older. The median age was 35 years. For every 100 females, there were 96.8 males. For every 100 females aged 18 and over, there were 92.5 males.

The median income for a household in the town was $33,750, and the median income for a family was $41,250. Males had a median income of $45,000 versus $18,333 for females. The per capita income was $12,861. About 9.1% of families and 11.2% of the population were below the poverty line, including 19.6% of those under age 18 and 1.9% of those aged 65 or over.

References

External links
 
 Elmo Town at Emery County official website

Towns in Emery County, Utah
Towns in Utah
Populated places established in 1908
1908 establishments in Utah